Nimisha Sajayan (born 4 January 1997) is an Indian actress in the Malayalam film industry. Nimisha made her acting debut with the film Thondimuthalum Driksakshiyum directed by Dileesh Pothan. She won the Kerala State Film Award for Best Actress in 2018 for her performance in Oru Kuprasidha Payyan and Chola. She is also a recipient of two Filmfare Award South and three SIIMA Awards.

Early and personal life
Nimisha was born in Mumbai to Sajayan, an engineer and Bindhu Sajayan, both originally from Kollam district of Kerala. Her mother's ancestral home is in Punalur, Kollam district.

Nimisha attended Carmel Convent School, Mumbai and graduated from KJ Somaiya College, Mumbai.

Acting career
Nimisha started her acting career with the film Thondimuthalum Driksakshiyum, directed by Dileesh Pothan. She then played the lead role in editor B. Ajithk and Rajeev Ravi's 'Eeda'. She won the 49th Kerala State Film Award for Best actress in 2019 for the movies Oru Kuprasidha Payyan directed by Madhupal and Chola directed by Sanal Kumar Sasidharan. Chola premiered at several International film festivals.

In 2021, she acted in The Great Indian Kitchen. The film as well as her performance were well received. The same year, she played lead roles in Nayattu and Malik. In 2022 she was a part of Oru Thekkan Thallu Case, Innale Vare and Heaven. Her upcoming films are Thuramukham and Chera.

Filmography

Films

Short films

Awards and nominations

Notes

References

External links 

Actresses in Malayalam cinema
Actresses in Marathi cinema
Actresses from Kollam
1997 births
Living people
Indian female taekwondo practitioners